The climate of Door County, Wisconsin is tempered by Green Bay and Lake Michigan. There are fewer extremely cold days and fewer hot days than in areas of Wisconsin directly to the west. Lake waters delay the coming of spring as well as extend mild temperatures in the fall.
Annual precipitation is slightly lower than elsewhere in northern Wisconsin. The county features a humid continental climate (classified as Dfb in Köppen) with warm summers and cold snowy winters.

Charts

Peninsular Agricultural Resource Station

Washington Island

Lake breeze 
On hot summer days, cool lake breezes start in around noon and grow more intense by mid-afternoon. This effect can be noticed at the shoreline and around a mile or so inland. Although lake breezes are capable of penetrating considerably further inland, they are able to heat up quickly after passing onto land. After as little as a mile of travel inland, they may be nearly as warm as the air they push away. When a lake breeze encounters an inward curving shoreline, such as at Sister Bay, the breeze becomes more intense. The curve of the shore guides the breezes from opposing sides of the bay and makes them converge upon each other at the middle.

Records and weather events
Lightning damaged multiple areas over a period of ten hours. The electric generator for Sturgeon Bay was shut down as a precaution to preserve the equipment. One man died in his burning barn while trying to save his horses. A train on the Ahnapee and Western Railroad failed to pass through after culverts were found washed out between Forestville and Maplewood.

Street thermometers in Sturgeon Bay in the shade reached , and storm clouds appeared in the west but did not give rain. It was part of a week-long hot and dry spell. County residents, along with hundreds of tourists and seasonal dwellers took time out to find a spot cool enough for comfort. The hot and dry weather damaged the already-poor cherry crop, with typical yields expected at 5 or 6 percent of normal. One processing plant remained shut down for the season, and another opted to open at a limited scale.

Records from Sturgeon Bay in the months prior to the 1871 Peshtigo fire indicate the area suffered from prolonged and abnormal dry conditions beginning in June.<ref>Climatic Conditions Preceding Historically Great Fires in the North Central Region by Donald A. Haines and Rodney W. Sando, Research Paper NC-34, United States Forest Service, United States Department of Agriculture, 1969, page 5, (page 7 of the pdf)</ref>

During a period of drought, the northwest corner of Chambers Island burned in a forest and bush fire on July 10, 1963. Nearly 40 acres were burned, which was thought to be caused by the careless use of a campfire. It took seven hours to put out, using green boughs to beat the fire, back pack tanks, and a water pump based in the bay. The county had only 4.24 inches of rain during April, May, and June, compared to the normal figure of 8.90 inches. Only 0.18 inches had fallen at the Agricultural Research Station since the beginning of July, although some parts of the county had received more rain.

On May 6–7th, 1960, the Peninsular Agricultural Research Station recorded  of rain over 48 hours.  was recorded at the station in Kewaunee. On May 7, the earthen portion of Forestville Dam failed due to the rain. Over a few minutes starting at approximately 7:30 AM, a 35–foot hole opened on the east side of the dam, and within an hour a 15–foot hole opened on the west side. South of the dam, County Trunk J was closed from 9:00 AM until late afternoon due to water pouring over the county trunk. Most of the millpond was drained, and some of the muck was exposed in the center. Flooding from heavy rains also closed Highway 57. Following this, the highway was built up. Heavy rains during May 1979 flooded a town road north of Highway 57, but not the highway itself. The Ahnapee River also flooded in September 1975 and nearly caused another dam failure. Floods on the Ahnapee are expected to reoccur approximately every 30 years.

On January 7, 1967, Washington Island received  of snow, setting the county record for the greatest one-day snowfall.  of snow again fell on April 14, 2018, this time at the Peninsular Agricultural Research Station.

On September 22, 1971, a blizzard forced about 620 Southern Door School District students to stay overnight in their school buildings. Some parents were able get their children home in the evening, many using snowmobiles. Busses sent the students home after breakfast the next day.

Ice accumulation during the winter of 2014 was the highest ever recorded on Lake Michigan.

Hail over two inches in diameter has been reported four times in the county. On July 28, 1912, hail the size of a man's two fists was reported near Ellison Bay. On June 27, 1978, a hailstorm hit an area from Sister Bay to Ellison Bay. Tennis-ball sized hail was reported. On September 26, 1998, 2.75 inch hail was reported in Baileys Harbor. On August 9, 2001, 3 inch hail was reported one mile south of Sturgeon Bay.

On June 4, 1955, two were killed by lightning while in a fishing boat about 100 feet from the shore in Sturgeon Bay. 

Tornadoes

Four tornadoes touched down between 1844 and 1880, and thirteen from 1950 to 1989, but there were no fatalities in any of them. Two crossed the Door-Kewaunee county line. From 1989 to 2019, there were 3 additional tornadoes, including the F3 "Door County tornado" which hit Egg Harbor in 1998. Additionally there were at least 11 waterspouts between 1950 and 2019.

Weather monitoring
Weather in the county is reported by WXN69 (FM 162.425), the NOAA weather radio station in Sister Bay. Green Bay and Lake Michigan ice thickness reports and forecasts are produced by NOAA.

Weather monitors in the county report terrestrial and marine weather conditions:

 See also 
Pollution in Door County, Wisconsin § Air
Rock Island State Park (Wisconsin) § Climate
Washington Island (Wisconsin) § Climate
Porte des Morts § Climate
Newport State Park § Climate
Sturgeon Bay, Wisconsin § Climate
Forestville, Wisconsin § Climate

 Climate of nearby locations 
To the south
Manitowoc, Wisconsin § Climate
Climate of Milwaukee
Climate of Chicago

To the southwest
Green Bay, Wisconsin § Climate
Madison, Wisconsin § Climate

To the west
Menominee, Michigan § Climate
Wausau, Wisconsin § Climate
Climate of Minneapolis–Saint Paul

To the north
Escanaba, Michigan § Climate
Manistique, Michigan § Climate

To the northeast
Beaver Island (Lake Michigan) § Climate

To the east
Frankfort, Michigan § Climate
Traverse City, Michigan § Climate

To the southeast
Manistee, Michigan § Climate

Broader areas
Geography of Wisconsin § Climate
Upper Peninsula of Michigan § Climate
Wisconsin tornado events (list by date)
Lake Michigan § Hydrology

References

External links
 Climate in Door County, Wisconsin, usafacts.org Code Red Emergency Alerts, co.door.wi.gov''

Climate of Wisconsin
Door County, Wisconsin